North Korea competed at the 2009 Asian Indoor Games in Hanoi, Vietnam on 30 October – 8 November 2009. North Korea sent a delegation of 3 competitors in the sport of swimming

Swimming

References

2009
Nations at the 2009 Asian Indoor Games
2009 in North Korean sport